Boys in the Trees is the seventh studio album by American singer-songwriter Carly Simon, released by Elektra Records, in April 1978.

The lead single, "You Belong to Me", reached No. 6 on the Billboard Pop Singles chart, becoming Simon's fifth Top 10 pop hit, and earned her a Grammy Award nomination for Best Pop Vocal Performance, Female. The second single, a remake of The Everly Brothers' 1958 hit "Devoted to You" (sung as a duet with then-husband James Taylor), also reached the Top 40, peaking at No. 36. The singles also hit the Top 10 on the Billboard Adult Contemporary chart, peaking at No. 4 and No. 2, respectively. The track "Tranquillo (Melt My Heart)" reached No. 86 on the US Cashbox Pop chart. Boys in the Trees became one of Simon's biggest selling albums, and was officially certified Platinum by the Recording Industry Association of America (RIAA) on August 7, 1978, for sales of over one million copies in the United States alone.

Reception and packaging

Janet Maslin, writing in Rolling Stone, stated "Boys in the Trees is Carly Simon's most serene accomplishment to date, but its moods vary dramatically enough to indicate that peace of mind comes at a high price." When praising the single "You Belong to Me", Maslin went on to write, "It's a number that could easily have been belted out or growled à la "You're So Vain", but this time Simon prefers to sound more like a cat who's been dining on canary. Somehow, she's a lot more compelling using a gently chiding tone than she is striking a come-hither-or-else pose."

In a retrospective review for AllMusic, William Ruhlmann rated the album 3 out of 5 stars, writing "what really made the album a winner was that Simon had had a couple of years to write some strong songs in her unflinching, reflective style, and she continued to explore the loves and mores of her age and class movingly." Cash Box said of the single "Tranquillo (Melt My Heart)" that a "funky arrangement of guitars, horns and strings follow a stepping beat" and praised Simon's "clean" vocal. "Boys in the Trees" is often played live by Tori Amos. "I used to listen to this song over and over, wishing I'd wrote it," Amos once said of the track.

The photo featured on the front cover of the album was expertly airbrushed to paint a Danskin top on what was a topless photo of Simon. The album won the Grammy Award for Best Album Package, the Grammy went to Johnny Lee and Tony Lane.

Awards

Track listing
Credits adapted from the album's liner notes.

Personnel

Musicians

Production

Charts
Album - Billboard (United States)

Album - International

Singles - Billboard (United States)

References

External links
Carly Simon's Official Website

1978 albums
Carly Simon albums
Elektra Records albums
Albums produced by Arif Mardin